Chris Foote Wood (born Christopher Wood, 15 December 1940) is an English politician and author. He is the brother of the late comedian and actress Victoria Wood.

Education and early career
Foote Wood was born in Prestbury, Cheshire, and is one of the four children of Stanley Wood and Nellie Mape; the late comedian Victoria Wood was one of his three sisters.

Foote Wood went to Bury Grammar School. He completed a four-year honours degree course in Civil Engineering at Kings College, Newcastle (then part of the University of Durham) but was not awarded a degree. He worked as a civil engineer for several years before starting Durham Free Press in 1968, but gave it up after three years to work as a freelance journalist and broadcaster. He later set up his own press agency, North Press News & Sport, and ran it for 30 years up to 2004.

Political career

Foote Wood has contested a large number of public elections at all levels. He has stood for Parliament nine times as a Liberal, later Liberal Democrat:

February 1974 – Newcastle upon Tyne NorthOctober 1974 and 2010 – Middlesbrough1979 – City of Durham1983 and 1987 – North West Durham2001 and 2005 – Bishop Auckland2017 – Middlesbrough South and East Cleveland

His best performance was in 1983 when he achieved 25.65% of the vote, whilst his lowest poll was in 2017, achieving 2.8% of the votes. He also stood for the European Parliament six times (1979 and 1984 for Durham; 1999 No. 1 on the North East list; 2004 No. 2 on the North East list; 2009 No. 2 on the North East list; 2014 No. 4 on the Yorkshire and the Humber list). He also stood as Mayor of Middlesbrough in 2011. Foote Wood was a district councillor in Bishop Auckland for 40 years, from 1967 to 2007 and was Leader of Wear Valley District Council for six years. He was also a member of Durham County Council for 12 years, vice-chairman of the North East Regional Assembly and a member of the EU Committee of the Regions, one of the three elected councillors representing the North East on this body and the first Liberal Democrat to do so.

He was the Liberal Democrat PPC in Richmond (Yorks) for the 2015 General election before stepping aside in March 2015. He joined the Labour party in 2018.

Author
Foote Wood's first book, Nellie's Book, about the early life of his mother was published in 2006. Foote Wood has written several more books, including When I'm Sixty-Four (1,001 things to do at 60+), and a guide to the 56 remaining seaside pleasure piers in Britain, Walking Over the Waves.

Works

Victoria Wood Comedy Genius – Her Life and Work, Published by The Memoir Club, 07552086888, 
Baghdad Trucker: Adventures of a Truck Driver, with Kevin Noble (co-author), Northern Writers (2006), 
Basil's Boys – Student Memories of Henderson Hall, Northern Writers (2010), 
Bishop Auckland in old picture postcards, European Library (1985), 
Discover Weardale, Allendale, S. Tynedale : the tourist and holiday guide to the area, Barnard Castle (1981), 
Kings of amateur soccer : the official centenary history of Bishop Auckland F.C., North Press (1985), 
Life of Brian in black & white : fifty years following Newcastle United, with Brian Hall (co-author), Northern Writers (2007), 
London squares : Green gems, hidden spaces, with Frances Foote Wood (co-author), Northern Writers (2010), 
My great British pier trip : 66 seaside piers in 21 days, Northern Writers (2008), 
Nellie's book : the early life of Victoria Wood's mother, with Nellie Wood (co-author), The History Press (2006), 
Proud to be a Geordie: The Life & Legacy of Jack Fawcett, Dysart Associates (2007)
T Dan Smith "Voice of the North" Downfall of a Visionary: The Life of the North-East's Most Charismatic Champion, Northern Writers (2010), 
Tales from the council chamber: Amusing Real-life Anecdotes, with Olive Brown, MBE (co-author), Northern Writers (2009), 
Tindale Towers: New Art Deco Mansion – How Mike Keen's Dream Home Was Planned, Designed and Built 2005–2007, Northern Writers (2008), 
The Derwentside Story: Derwentside District Council – 35 Years Serving the People, Northern Writers (2009), 
Walking Over the Waves: Quintessential British Seaside Piers, Whittles Publishing (2008), 
When I'm Sixty Four: 1001 Things to Do at 60+, Capall Bann Publishing (2007),

References

"Book commemorates council's history." Europe Intelligence Wire 16 March 2009. General OneFile. Retrieved 17 October 2012. GALE|A195743082 (review of The Derwentside Story)
"Bestseller reveals the hidden history of authority." Europe Intelligence Wire 1 April 2009. General OneFile. Retrieved 17 October 2012. GALE|A196958199 (review of The Derwentside Story)
"Baghdad Trucker." Evening Telegraph [Derby], 19 May 2007. 18, Newspaper Source Plus, EBSCO. Retrieved 17 October 2012. (review of Baghdad Trucker)
"Author talks about pier." Evening Post [South Wales], 13 June 2008. 10, Newspaper Source Plus, EBSCO. Retrieved 17 October 2012. (notice of author appearance)

External links
 Chris Foote-Wood official site
 Chris Foote Wood PPC profile at the site of Liberal Democrats
 Guardian Unlimited Politics – Ask Aristotle: Chris Foote Wood

Liberal Democrats (UK) councillors
1940 births
Living people
People educated at Bury Grammar School
People from Bishop Auckland
Councillors in County Durham
Liberal Democrats (UK) parliamentary candidates
Leaders of local authorities of England
Alumni of King's College, Newcastle